In qualification for the 2007 Rugby World Cup, there were two places available for Oceania teams, and one place in the repechage. In the group rounds, there were three points awarded for a win, two for a draw, and one for a loss. There were no bonus points awarded.

Qualification process

Round 1 and 2 

These rounds corresponded to the 2005 FORU Oceania Cup, played by the six lowest tier teams of Oceania. 
Teames were divided in two pools: Pool A, with three teams from the Oceania East region, and Pool B with three teams from the Oceania West region. The winner of each group qualified for the finals (Round 2), a playoff home and away. The winner advanced to Round 4.

Round 3
A round robin league between Tonga, Samoa and Fiji. Winner qualified directly to RWC 2007 as Oceania 1, Runner Up as Oceania 2, and third place advanced to Round 4.

Round 4
Winner of Round 2 vs 3rd placed team from Round 3. Winner progressed to Repechage round as "Oceania 3", to meet "Asia 2".

Round 1

Pool A 
Papua New Guinea won the pool and advanced to Round 2.

Final Standings

Pool B 
Cook Islands won the pool and advanced to Round 2.

Final Standings

Round 2
The teams split the series, with Cook Islands winning on aggregate score to advance to Round 4.

Cook Islands won 48–32 on aggregate

Round 3
Samoa and Fiji qualified for RWC 2007 as Oceania 1 & 2, Tonga progressed to Round 4.

Final Standings

Round 4

Tonga swept the series and advanced to Repechage Round as Oceania 3, to meet Asia 2, South Korea.

Tonga won 167–10 on aggregate

External links
 World Cup website

2007
2007 Rugby World Cup qualification
World Cup
World Cup